List of presidents of the National Assembly of Mali.

Below is a list of office-holders:

References

Politics of Mali
Mali, National Assembly
Presidents of the National Assembly (Mali)